Federated Media may refer to:

Businesses 
Federated Media (broadcasting), a radio broadcasting company based in Mishawaka, Indiana.
Federated Media Publishing, an advertising network founded by John Battelle in 2005 and sold to LIN Media in 2014.